The Kalbids were a Muslim Arab dynasty in the Emirate of Sicily, which ruled from 948 to 1053. They were formally appointed by the Fatimids, but gained, progressively, de facto autonomous rule.

History
In 827, in the midst of internal Byzantine conflict, the Muslim conquest of Sicily began: the Aghlabids arrived at Marsala in Sicily, with a fleet of 10,000 men under the command of Asad ibn al-Furat. Palermo was conquered in 831 and became the new capital. Syracuse fell in 878 and in 902 the last Byzantine outpost, Taormina, was taken. At the same time various Muslim incursions into southern Italy occurred, with new Emirates being founded in Tropea, Taranto and Bari. During this period there were constant power struggles amongst the Muslims. Nominally the island was under rule of the Aghlabids and later the Fatimids.

After successfully suppressing a revolt the Fatimid caliph appointed al-Hasan al-Kalbi (948–953) as Emir of Sicily, the first of the Kalbid dynasty. The Fatimids appointed the Kalbids as rulers via proxy before they shifted their capital from Ifriqiya to Cairo in 969. Raids into southern Italy continued under the Kalbids into the 11th century, and in 982 a German army under Otto II was defeated by Abu'l-Qasim in the Battle of Stilo near Crotone in Calabria. The dynasty began a steady period of decline with the Emirate of Yusuf al-Kalbi (990-998) who entrusted the island to his sons and created space for interference from the Zirids of Ifriqiya. Under al-Akhal (1017–1037) the dynastic conflict intensified, with factions allying themselves variously with Byzantium and the Zirids. Even though neither of these powers could establish themselves in Sicily permanently, under Hasan as-Samsam (1040–1053) the island fragmented into small fiefdoms. The Kalbids died out in 1053, and in 1061 the Normans of southern Italy arrived under Roger I of Sicily and began their conquest, which was completed in 1091. The Muslims were allowed to remain and played an important role in the administration, army and economy of the Norman kingdom until the 12th century.

The Kalbites focused their efforts on the Islamization of Sicilian society, notably in 962 with a large ceremony, where fourteen thousand children were circumcised simultaneously; after a Byzantine offensive, crushed in 965 at the Battle of the Ditch or Rametta, the fâtimid caliph Mu'izz had the Kalbite emir perform a great incastellamento in 967, a movement that represents a profound transformation of the habitat. It decides the forced regrouping of all inhabitants in a small number of cities or medina, one per district, each guarded by a castle and equipped with a Friday mosque, essential to ensure political fidelity and religious indoctrination. It was not just a question of bringing Islam into the Sicilian way of life, but also of conveying the Shiite message on which the dynasty is based.

Under the Kalbid dynasty, Sicily, and especially Palermo, was an important economic centre of the Mediterranean. The Muslims introduced lemons, Seville oranges and sugar cane, as well as cotton and mulberries for sericulture, and built irrigation systems for agriculture. Sicily was also an important hub for trade between the Near East, North Africa and the Italian maritime republics such as Amalfi, Pisa and Genoa.

Rulers

 al-Hasan al-Kalbi (948–953)
 Ahmad ibn al-Hasan al-Kalbi (954–969) 
 Ya'ish (969-970)
 Abu'l-Qasim Ali ibn al-Hasan al-Kalbi (970–982) 
 Jabir ibn Ali ibn al-Kalbi (982–983)
 Ja'far I ibn Muhammad ibn al-Kalbi (983–985) 
 Abdallah ibn Muhammad ibn al-Kalbi (985–990)
 Abu'l-Futuh Yusuf ibn Abdallah ibn al-Kalbi (990–998)
 Ja'far II ibn al-Kalbi (998–1019)
 al-Akhal (1019–1037)
 Abdallah (1037–1040), Zirid usurper
 Hasan as-Samsam (1040–1053)

See also
History of Islam in Southern Italy
List of Shi'a Muslim dynasties
Mirdasid dynasty
Muslim conquest of Sicily
Uqailids
Jarwanid dynasty
Usfurids
Banu 'Amir

References

Sources

External links
 Sicily(Italy):A Great Centre of the Islamic Civilization

 
Arab dynasties
Shia dynasties
States and territories established in the 940s
948 establishments